Group B of the EuroBasket Women 2015 took place between 11 and 15 June 2015. The group played all of its games at Arena Antonio Alexe in Oradea, Romania.

The group composed of Belarus, Greece, Italy, Poland and Turkey. The three best ranked teams advanced to the second round.

Standings

All times are local (UTC+3).

11 June

Poland vs Turkey

Italy vs Belarus

12 June

Greece vs Italy

Belarus vs Poland

13 June

Poland vs Greece

Turkey vs Belarus

14 June

Italy vs Poland

Greece vs Turkey

15 June

Belarus vs Greece

Turkey vs Italy

External links
Official website

Group B
2014–15 in Belarusian basketball
2014–15 in Turkish basketball
2014–15 in Greek basketball
2014–15 in Italian basketball
2014–15 in Polish basketball